This is a list of candidates for the 1891 New South Wales colonial election. The election was held from 17 June to 3 July 1891.

Retiring Members

Protectionist
William Alison MLA (Bogan)
Wyman Brown MLA (Sturt)
Myles McRae MLA (Morpeth)
Alfred Stokes MLA (Forbes)

Free Trade
Charles Garland MLA (Carcoar)
Thomas Garrett MLA (Camden)
Alexander Hutchison MLA (Canterbury)
Joseph Mitchell MLA (Illawarra)
John Shepherd MLA (Paddington)
Edwin Turner MLA (Gunnedah)
James Wilshire MLA (Canterbury)
Francis Woodward MLA (Illawarra)

Independent
Adolphus Taylor MLA (West Sydney)
Cecil Teece MLA (Goulburn)

Legislative Assembly
Sitting members are shown in bold text. Successful candidates are highlighted in the relevant colour and marked with an asterisk (*).

Electorates are arranged chronologically from the day the poll was held. Because of the sequence of polling, some sitting members who were defeated in their constituencies were then able to contest other constituencies later in the polling period. On the second occasion, these members are shown in italic text.

See also
 Members of the New South Wales Legislative Assembly, 1891–1894

References
 

1891